Avebrevicauda (meaning "birds with short tails") is a group which includes all avialan species with ten or fewer free vertebrae in the tail. The group was named in 2002 by Gregory S. Paul to distinguish short-tailed avialans from their ancestors, such as Archaeopteryx, which had long, reptilian tails.

The cladogram below follows the results of a phylogenetic study by Wang et al., 2016.

References

Avialans
Extant Early Cretaceous first appearances
Taxa named by Gregory S. Paul